Burlinka is a rural locality (a selo) in Partizansky Selsoviet, Burlinsky District, Altai Krai, Russia. The population was 41 as of 2011. It was founded in 1908. There are 2 streets.

Geography 
Burlinka is located 23 km southeast of Burla (the district's administrative centre) by road. Bursol is the nearest rural locality.

References 

Rural localities in Burlinsky District